The 1952 IRFU College Draft was an unofficial sports draft held by the Interprovincial Rugby Football Union, a predecessor of the East Division of the Canadian Football League, in the spring of 1952. The concept was first developed at a meeting between Eastern officials on April 6, 1952. In the meeting, the delegates agreed, in principle, that eligible college athletes would be selected by member clubs with the last place team selecting first in each round. While the draft was unofficial, players selected in this draft were indeed added to the rosters of the clubs that had drafted them.

Seventeen players were chosen from among eligible players from five eastern universities, McGill University, Queen's University, University of Toronto, University of Western Ontario, and McMaster University. The Montreal Alouettes had the first selection, as well as the most, since they also had the last selection.

Round one

Round two

Round three

Round four

References

Canadian College Draft
1952 in Canadian football